"Apple of My Eye" is a song recorded by the rock/pop band Badfinger for inclusion on their 1973 album, Ass.  The song was written and sung by Pete Ham, produced by Chris Thomas and Badfinger, and released on Apple Records.

Writing
Ham wrote the song about his mixed feelings upon the band's leaving Apple Records (which was the "apple of my eye" to Ham) to pursue a larger contract by moving to Warner Bros. Records.  The same concern is reflected on the Ass album cover, which shows a donkey following a carrot into the distance.  Coincidentally, disregarding those performed by an ex-Beatle, it was the last single (Apple 49) released by Apple before its collapse.

Problems and release
Due to Apple's financial chaos and its problems with the group, no new picture sleeve was created for the single, although some countries (such as the Netherlands, shown here) used a variant of the "Day After Day" sleeve.  It would become the original group's last single to chart in the US, although it missed making the Billboard Hot 100, peaking at number 102 on the "Bubbling Under Hot 100 Singles" chart. It reached number 11 in South Africa.

In most countries, Tom Evans' "Blind Owl" was released as the B-side.  However, in Japan, "Apple of My Eye" was backed with Mike Gibbins' song "Cowboy", and in the Philippines, Evans' "When I Say" was the B-side.

Personnel
Pete Ham – vocals, acoustic guitar, keyboards
Tom Evans – bass guitar
Joey Molland – electric guitar 
Mike Gibbins – drums, percussion

References

Apple Records singles
Badfinger songs
1973 singles
Songs written by Pete Ham
Song recordings produced by Chris Thomas (record producer)
Song recordings produced by Pete Ham